Euclasta socotrensis is a moth in the family Crambidae. It was described by Popescu-Gorj and Constantinescu in 1977. It is found in Yemen, where it has been recorded from Socotra.

References

Moths described in 1977
Pyraustinae
Endemic fauna of Socotra